The Emirate of Tbilisi was a Muslim emirate in Transcaucasia. The Emirs of Tbilisi ruled over the parts of today's eastern Georgia from their base in the city of Tbilisi, from 736 to 1080 (nominally to 1122). Established by the Arabs during their invasions of Georgian lands, the emirate was an important outpost of the Muslim rule in the Caucasus until recaptured by the Georgians under King David IV in 1122. The city continued to serve as the seat of the Georgian kings, while being under the suzerainty of Persia until the Treaty of Turkmenchay.

History 

The Arabs first appeared in Georgia, namely in Kartli (Iberia) in 645. It was not, however, until 735, when they succeeded in establishing their firm control over a large portion of the country. In that year, Marwan II took hold of Tbilisi and much of the neighbouring lands and installed there an Arab emir, who was to be confirmed by the Caliph or, occasionally, by the ostikan of Armīniya.

During the Arab period, Tbilisi (al-Tefelis) grew into a center of trade between the Islamic world and northern Europe. Beyond that, it functioned as a key Arab outpost and a buffer province facing the Byzantine and Khazar dominions. Over time, Tbilisi became largely Muslim, but the Muslim influences were strictly confined to the city itself, while the environs remained largely Christian.

Tbilisi was a large city with a strong double wall pierced by three gates. It layilsami on both banks of the Kura River, and the two parts were connected by a bridge of boats. The contemporary geographers especially mention its thermal springs, which supplied the baths with constant hot waters. On the river were water-mills. The houses were primarily built, to the surprise of contemporary Arab travelers, of pine wood. In the first half of the ninth century, Tbilisi is said to have been the second largest, after Derbend, a city in the Caucasus, with its at least 50,000 inhabitants and thriving commerce. Several intellectuals born or living in Tbilisi, bearing the nisba al-Tiflisi were known across the Muslim world.

The Abbasid Caliphate weakened after the Abbasid civil war in the 810s, and caliphal power was challenged by secessionist tendencies among peripheral rulers, including those of Tbilisi. At the same time, the emirate became a target of the resurgent Georgian Bagrationi dynasty who were expanding their territory from Tao-Klarjeti across Georgian lands. The Emirate of Tbilisi grew in relative strength under Ishaq ibn Isma'il (833–853), who was powerful enough to quell the energies of the Georgian princes and to contend with the Abbasid authority in the region. He withheld his annual payment of tribute to Baghdad, and declared his independence from the Caliph. To suppress the rebellion, in 853 Caliph al-Mutawakkil dispatched a punitive expedition led by Bugha al-Kabir (also known as Bugha the Turk) who burned Tbilisi to the ground and had Ishaq decapitated, putting an end to the city's chance to become the center of an independent Islamic state in the Caucasus. The Abbasids chose not to rebuild the city extensively, and as a result the Muslim prestige and authority in the region began to wane.

Beginning in the 1020s, the Georgian kings pursued a contradictory but generally expansionist policy against the emirs of Tbilisi, this latter coming sporadically under Georgian control. The territories of the emirate shrank to Tbilisi and its immediate environs. However, the Seljuk invasions of the 1070s–1080s thwarted the Georgian advance and deferred the Bagratid plans for nearly a half of a century. The last line of emirs of Tbilisi ended, presumably, circa 1080, and the city was run thereafter by the merchant oligarchy known in the Georgian annals as tbileli berebi, that is,  the elders of Tbilisi. Georgian King David IV’s victories over the Seljuk Turks inflicted a final blow to Islamic Tbilisi, and a Georgian army entered the city in 1122, ending four hundred years of Muslim rule.

Legacy 
The office of emir — amira or amirtamira — now an appointed Georgian royal official — survived in Tbilisi, as well as other big cities of Georgia, into the 18th century, being substituted by the office of mouravi.

Rulers

Sources 

Allen, WED (1932), A History of the Georgian People, K. Paul, Trench, Trubner & Co,
Minorsky, V.,  Tiflis in Encyclopaedia of Islam
Suny RG (1994), The Making of the Georgian Nation (2nd Edition), Bloomington and Indianapolis,

References

External links 
Tiflis dirhams at Zeno.ru – Oriental Coins Database

Tbilisi
Medieval Georgia (country)
Islam in Georgia (country)
1122 disestablishments
736 establishments
History of Tbilisi
History of the Abbasid Caliphate
States and territories disestablished in 1121